Christopher Reid (born April 5, 1964), formerly known as Kid (shortened from his original MC name, Kid Coolout), is an American rapper, actor and comedian. During the peak of his career with the rap duo Kid 'n Play (with Christopher Martin), Reid was notable for both his seven-inch, vertical hi-top fade and freckles.

Life and career
Reid was born in The Bronx, New York, to a Jamaican father (1928–2019) and an Irish mother (1930–1973). He graduated from the Bronx High School of Science in 1982. He also graduated in 1990 from Lehman College in the Bronx after attending Miles College.

He is best known as one half of late-1980s/early-1990s hip hop musical act Kid 'n Play with fellow rapper/actor Christopher "Play" Martin. Reid was particularly notable for his extreme hi-top fade hairstyle. Reid has appeared on a number of television programs, including Martin and Sister, Sister, and has served as the host of amateur contest shows, such as Your Big Break and It's Showtime at the Apollo. Reid tours as a stand-up comedian.

Reid's most recent musical contribution has been writing the theme song to HBO's Real Time with Bill Maher. He also appeared on the VH1 reality magician game show Celebracadabra in 2008. Pursuing a solo career, he released a music video for a song called "Why Don't You Stay", to which he raps and sings on the track. He appeared in The Asylum's film War of the Worlds 2: The Next Wave, a sequel to H.G. Wells' War of the Worlds.

He has been a guest on The Dawn and Drew Show, Comics Unleashed, New England Sports Network's Comedy All-Stars, and Slanted Comedy.

He played the role of The Rhymer on the TV series Supah Ninjas.

He also appears in LMFAO's video for "Sorry for Party Rocking".

In 2012, he broke into voice-over work in the military shooter video game Spec Ops: The Line, in which he plays Lt. Alphanso Adams, part of a three-man squad sent into a ruined Dubai to investigate a signal from an MIA military unit, The Damned 33rd.

He is a known fan of the sports radio station in Dallas “The Ticket” 1310 AM/96.7 FM. He is “guest picker” of sports picks on the station and has guest hosted “The Norm And D Invasion” with Donovan Lewis.

Discography
 1988: 2 Hype
 1990: Funhouse
 1991: Face the Nation

Filmography
 1990: House Party
 1991: House Party 2
 1992: Class Act
 1992: Martin - Guest appearance (Season 1, Episode 6)
 1994: House Party 3
 1996-1997: Sister, Sister
 1998: The Temptations
 2001: Sealab 2021
 2003: Pauly Shore Is Dead
 2005: Barbershop: The Series
 2008: War of the Worlds 2: The Next Wave
 2009: Hell's Kitchen
 2010: Freaknik: The Musical
 2011: Supah Ninjas
 2012-2014: Black Dynamite: The Animated Series
 2013: Mad
 2013: House Party: Tonight's the Night
 2021: Apple & Onion
 2023: House Party

Video games
 Spec Ops: The Line – 1st Lieutenant Alphonso Adams

References

External links

1964 births
Living people
American male film actors
American stand-up comedians
Television personalities from New York City
The Bronx High School of Science alumni
American people of Irish descent
American people of Jamaican descent
Rappers from the Bronx
American male television actors
Lehman College alumni
American male singers
American male rappers
American male video game actors
American male voice actors
American male television writers
Comedians from New York (state)
Screenwriters from New York (state)
21st-century American comedians
21st-century American screenwriters
21st-century American male writers